Greatest Hits is a compilation album by the progressive rock band the Moody Blues, released in 1989. The band recorded new versions of "Isn't Life Strange" and "Question" with orchestration by the London Symphony Orchestra. The arrangements were overseen by Anne Dudley, who also produced the recordings with Justin Hayward and John Lodge. In 1990, only a year after it's original release, the album was re-released as Legend of a Band: The Story of the Moody Blues with different artwork to coincide with the release of the home video documentary of the same name.

Original track listing
All songs written by Justin Hayward except where noted.

Side one
 "Your Wildest Dreams" – 4:51
 "The Voice" – 5:14
 "Gemini Dream" (Hayward, John Lodge) – 4:06
 "The Story in Your Eyes" – 3:03
 "Tuesday Afternoon" – 4:41
 "Isn't Life Strange (1988 version)" (Lodge, orch. arr. by Anne Dudley) – 6:36

Side two
 "The Night: Nights in White Satin/Late Lament" (Hayward/Graeme Edge, Peter Knight) – 7:38
 "I Know You're Out There Somewhere" – 6:37
 "The Other Side of Life" – 6:49 (Not on European vinyl LP, but included on CD and Cassette format)
 "Ride My See-Saw" (Lodge) – 3:44
 "I'm Just a Singer" (Lodge) – 4:17
 "Question (1988 version)" (Hayward, orch. arr. by Anne Dudley) – 5:44

Personnel

The Moody Blues
 Graeme Edge – drums, percussion, maracas, backing vocals
 Justin Hayward – acoustic and electric guitars, guitar synthesiser, lead and backing vocals
 John Lodge – bass guitar, lead and backing vocals
 Patrick Moraz – keyboards, piano, Mellotron, Oberheim Custom double 8-voice synthesiser, Yamaha CS80, Roland Jupiter 8, Minimoog (except on 5, 7, 10 and 11)
 Mike Pinder – keyboards, piano, mellotron, Chamberlin, spoken word, gong, backing vocals (on 5, 7, 10 and 11)
 Ray Thomas – flute, tambourine, backing vocals (except on 1 and 8)

Additional personnel
 Peter Knight conducting the London Festival Orchestra – orchestral arrangements on 5 and 7
 Anne Dudley, with Alexander Barantschik conducting the London Symphony Orchestra – orchestral arrangements on 6 and 12
 Frank Ricotti – additional percussion on 12

Charts

Certifications

References

1989 greatest hits albums
The Moody Blues compilation albums
Polydor Records compilation albums